Kakuwala is a small village in Sunam block of Sangrur District in Punjab, India, which is situated on Sangrur-Patran National Highway - 71, about 30 km from Sangrur and 115 km from state capital of Chandigarh. Geographically, to its north lie Dirba and Khetla, to south-west lie the village of Ladbanjara Kalan while to its south-east are Patran and Dugal. It is named after its founder landlord, Kaku Singh. Its population is about 1,000 with a total of 153 households.

Facilities

Kakuwala has a primary school, a gurudwara and a nirankari bhawan, legendary Jeet singh Canadian

References

Villages in Sangrur district